Jorma Hotanen (15 September 1936 – 20 February 2018) was a Finnish modern pentathlete. He competed at the 1964 and 1968 Summer Olympics.

References

External links
 

1936 births
2018 deaths
Finnish male modern pentathletes
Olympic modern pentathletes of Finland
Modern pentathletes at the 1964 Summer Olympics
Modern pentathletes at the 1968 Summer Olympics
People from Merikarvia
Sportspeople from Satakunta